Savageland is a 2015 American mockumentary horror film written and directed by Phil Guidry, Simon Herbert, and David Whelan, concerning a massacre on a US-Mexico border town that leaves every citizen dead except for an amateur photographer who is accused of committing it.

Plot 
On the night of June 2, 2011, The Bordertown of Sangre De Cristo, Arizona was besieged by an undisclosed incident resulting in the grisly massacre of the town's population of 57 residents. The bodies of most residents are never found, and remains of the victims are dismembered and covered with human bite marks.

The police apprehend the lone survivor of the event: Francisco Salazar, town resident, handyman, and amateur photographer, who was caught trying to flee south to Mexico. Due to him also being a loner, drifter, and having illegally entered the country years before, he is labeled as the prime suspect of the killings. He also falls under suspicion after being accused of having an inappropriate relationship with Grace Putnam, the young daughter of religious missionary Duane, who is a friend of Salazar's; other residents acknowledge the dynamic was innocent. Salazar refuses to speak and, despite contradictory evidence pointing to it being impossible that he committed the murders—a lack of motive, the difficulty of killing so many residents in a single evening, and the fact that he himself has the same bite marks as the victims—he is found guilty and sentenced to death by lethal injection. Interviews with residents, families of victims, and Salazar's sister give mixed opinions on Salazar's character and guilt. Salazar himself is ambivalent about the trial, and grants only one interview with a criminal psychologist. He claims that he brought his camera along on the night of June 2 to document the events, but lost the footage while escaping; however, one camera roll is eventually discovered by a resident who had initially apprehended him, and forwarded to an independent journalist working on the case.

Though the photographs are dismissed by his lawyer, the police, and the courts as being doctored, a professional photographer and Border Patrol specialist examine the camera roll, determine it as genuine, and piece together what must have happened that night, which corroborates Salazar's sole interview: at his house on the outskirts of town, Salazar was visited by a young man and friend suffering from mysterious wounds and blood loss. After the young man dies while Salazar attempts to call for help, he suddenly comes back to life and violently attacks Salazar, who is forced to kill him again. Salazar exits his house and witnesses mysterious figures approaching from the hills near his home. While running to Sangre De Cristo for help, he encounters another resident, a professional hunter who shoots the approaching zombies but is unable to kill them before being overcome. Salazar photographs a number of disturbing images of violent, contorted zombies attacking, devouring, and turning residents before attempting to make his way to the church to find the Putnams. However, he discovers that the horde has already descended upon the church, and it is revealed that Duane was driven insane after being turned and killed everyone in his family except for Grace, before committing suicide. Salazar, having keys to abandoned buildings in town due to his work as a handyman, runs and hides until he reaches the town's daycare center, which has been overrun by zombies. There he finds Grace, who is separated from him by a gated window, and he is forced to watch her be devoured.

Some praise Salazar's bravery for documenting the night, while others dismiss the photographs as fake or criticize him for not doing more to help the residents. Only Duane is posthumously determined to have murdered his family, and is buried separately from them. Salazar is ultimately executed, but after some locals attempt to vandalize his grave, they discover that his body is missing. After the Border Patrol specialist warns that Salazar's evidence indicates that the horde of zombies is steadily moving north, and Sangre De Cristo was merely in the way, it is revealed that mysterious deaths and disappearances have been recorded hundreds of miles away from the town. In one recovered piece of video footage, a group of campers is attacked and turned by a group of zombies, including an undead Salazar, which proves him correct and turns him into a martyr as the rest of the country prepares for more zombie attacks.

Cast 
 Noe Montes as Francisco Salazar
 Monica Davis as Monica Romas
 Edward L. Green as Gus Greer
 Patrick Pedraza as Patrick Ventura
 VaLynn Rain as Grace Putnam
 Lawrence Ross as himself
 David Saucedo as David Castillo
 George Lionel Savage as Sheriff John Parano
 Jason Stewart as Attorney Greg Daubman
 Len Wein as Len Matheson

Reception 
The film received positive reviews. Writing for Bloody Disgusting, Mike Wilson praised the film, especially its social commentary, saying it pulled it off without being clumsy".

References

External links 
 

2015 films
Found footage films
Films set in Arizona
American mockumentary films
American horror films
2010s American films